Modelia is a genus of medium to large sea snails in which the shell has a pearly interior and the snail has a calcareous operculum; marine gastropod mollusks, marine gastropod molluscs in the family Turbinidae, the turban snails.

Species
Species within the genus Modelia include:
 Modelia granosa (Martyn, 1784)
Species brought into synonymy
 Modelia guttata A. Adams, 1863: synonym of Bolma guttata (A. Adams, 1863)

References

 Williams, S.T. (2007). Origins and diversification of Indo-West Pacific marine fauna: evolutionary history and biogeography of turban shells (Gastropoda, Turbinidae). Biological Journal of the Linnean Society, 2007, 92, 573–592

Further reading 
 Powell A W B, New Zealand Mollusca, William Collins Publishers Ltd, Auckland, New Zealand 1979 

 
Turbinidae
Taxa named by John Edward Gray